Bodio Lomnago is a town and comune (municipality) located in the province of Varese, in the Lombardy region of northern Italy.

Bodio Lomnago is composed of two villages: Bodio, the biggest one closer to the lake and Lomnago, uphill toward the Monte Rogorella. Both villages have certainly a pre-Roman origin, probably Celtic or Gaulish.

Main sights
In Bodio:
 San Crocifisso, a small Romanesque church of the primitive village, recently renovated
Santa Maria church, a Baroque building from 1512
 Villa Beltrami-Gadola, with its distinctive tower

In Lomnago:
 San Giorgio, an unusual Norman-style church built in the 19th century
Villa Puricelli, with its huge park and the ancient hidden icehouse

World heritage site
It is home to one or more prehistoric pile-dwelling (or stilt house) settlements that are part of the Prehistoric Pile dwellings around the Alps UNESCO World Heritage Site.

References

Cities and towns in Lombardy